Nicholas Christopher Richard Larkin (born 1 May 1990) is an Australian cricketer. He made his first-class debut for New South Wales on 31 October 2014 in the 2014–15 Sheffield Shield. On 10 January 2016 he made his Twenty20 debut for the Sydney Sixers in the 2015–16 Big Bash League. He now plays for the Melbourne Stars. He also represented Ireland in two List A games against Sri Lanka A in 2014.

References

External links
 

1990 births
Living people
Australian cricketers
Ireland cricketers
Northern Knights cricketers
Melbourne Stars cricketers
New South Wales cricketers
Sportsmen from New South Wales
Sydney Sixers cricketers